August Friedrich Jäger (21 August 1887 – 17 June 1949) was a German official of the Nazi era. In the Reichsgau Wartheland (Polish areas annexed by Nazi Germany), Jäger served as administrative chief to the regional leader Arthur Greiser. Earlier, Jäger had led the effort at Nazification of the Evangelical Church in Prussia. In Poland, he earned the nickname "Kirchen-Jäger" (Church-Hunter) for the vehemence of his hostility to the Catholic Church. "By the end of 1941", wrote Richard J. Evans, "the Polish Catholic Church had been effectively outlawed in the Wartheland. It was more or less Germanized in the other occupied territories, despite an encyclical issued by the Pope as early as 27 October 1939 protesting against this persecution."

After the war, Jäger was arrested by the British military. In 1946, he was extradited to Poland to stand trial for crimes against humanity. Jäger found guilty, sentenced to death, and executed in 1949.

References

1887 births
1949 deaths
Nazi Party politicians
Kirchenkampf
Holocaust perpetrators in Poland
People executed for crimes against humanity
Nazis executed by Poland by hanging
Prisoners and detainees of the British military
People extradited to Poland